Bernard Aloysius "Bud" Culloton (May 19, 1896 – November 9, 1976) was a pitcher in Major League Baseball. He played for the Pittsburgh Pirates.

References

External links

1896 births
1976 deaths
Major League Baseball pitchers
Pittsburgh Pirates players
Norfolk Mary Janes players
New Haven Profs players
Baseball players from New York (state)
Sportspeople from Kingston, New York
Burials in Ulster County, New York